A Chrestomathy is a retrospective two-CD compilation of songs by Dave Van Ronk released in 1992. Its liner notes explain the title: "CHRES-TO-MA-THY: a selection of choice passages. WHICH MEANS THIS IS A SELECTION OF CHOICE WORKS FROM MORE THAN THIRTY YEARS OF DAVE'S MUSIC ON RECORDS."

Van Ronk recorded for many record labels. This compilation was released by Gazell Records.

Reception

Writing for Allmusic, critic William Ruhlman wrote of the album "his affection for the pop music of his childhood ("Two Sleepy People," sung with Christine Lavin, "Swinging on a Star"), makes for a more varied chrestomathy than those who think of Dave Van Ronk simply as a folksinger might expect. It's hard to summarize more than three decades in the career of a steadily working musician in less than two hours, even one who recorded in as piecemeal a fashion as this one, but this compilation does a good job."

Track listing

Disc 1

Tracks 10-15 originally on The Hudson Dusters

Disc 2

Track 1 originally on Songs for Ageing Children
Tracks 2-4 originally on The Ragtime Jug Stompers
Track 9 originally on Peter and the Wolf
Tracks 10-11 originally on Let No One Deceive You

References

1990 compilation albums
Dave Van Ronk compilation albums